San Cristóbal District may refer to:
 San Cristóbal District, Paraguay
 San Cristóbal District, Luya, a district in the Amazonas Region of Peru

District name disambiguation pages